Tamalpais-Homestead Valley is a census-designated place (CDP) in Marin County, California, United States. The population was 11,492 at the 2020 census.

Geography
It is bordered by Mill Valley to the north and Sausalito to the southeast. It is about 10 minutes north of San Francisco and the Golden Gate Bridge by car. California State Route 1 (also known as Shoreline Highway and the Pacific Coast Highway) runs through the Valley and is the road most often used to access western Marin County. Nearby landmarks include the Golden Gate National Recreation Area, Mount Tamalpais State Park, Muir Woods National Monument, Tennessee Valley and Muir Beach.

Demographics

2010
At the 2010 census Tamalpais-Homestead Valley had a population of 10,735. The racial makeup of Tamalpais-Homestead Valley was 9,449 (88.0%) White, 91 (0.8%) African American, 24 (0.2%) Native American, 592 (5.5%) Asian, 28 (0.3%) Pacific Islander, 121 (1.1%) from other races, and 430 (4.0%) from two or more races. Hispanic or Latino people of any race were 499 people (4.6%).

The census reported that 99.9% of the population lived in households and 0.1% lived in non-institutionalized group quarters.

There were 4,447 households, 1,516 (34.1%) had children under the age of 18 living in them, 2,458 (55.3%) were opposite-sex married couples living together, 312 (7.0%) had a female householder with no husband present, 149 (3.4%) had a male householder with no wife present.  There were 234 (5.3%) unmarried opposite-sex partnerships, and 65 (1.5%) same-sex married couples or partnerships. 1,143 households (25.7%) were one person and 383 (8.6%) had someone living alone who was 65 or older. The average household size was 2.41.  There were 2,919 families (65.6% of households); the average family size was 2.92.

The age distribution was 2,571 people (23.9%) under the age of 18, 345 people (3.2%) aged 18 to 24, 2,344 people (21.8%) aged 25 to 44, 3,964 people (36.9%) aged 45 to 64, and 1,511 people (14.1%) who were 65 or older.  The median age was 45.5 years. For every 100 females, there were 94.4 males.  For every 100 females age 18 and over, there were 92.2 males.

There were 4,703 housing units at an average density of 1,010.9 per square mile, of the occupied units 76.1% were owner-occupied and 23.9% were rented. The homeowner vacancy rate was 1.3%; the rental vacancy rate was 4.6%. 79.5% of the population lived in owner-occupied housing units and 20.4% lived in rental housing units.

2000
At the 2000 census there were 10,691 people, 4,558 households, and 2,803 families living in the CDP. The racial makeup of the CDP in 2010 was 85.0% non-Hispanic White, 0.8% non-Hispanic African American, 0.1% Native American, 5.5% Asian, 0.2% Pacific Islander, 0.3% from other races, and 3.4% from two or more races. Hispanic or Latino people of any race were 4.6%.

Of the 4,558 households 28.9% had children under the age of 18 living with them, 51.5% were married couples living together, 6.9% had a female householder with no husband present, and 38.5% were non-families. 25.7% of households were one person and 5.4% were one person aged 65 or older.  The average household size was 2.33 and the average family size was 2.80.

The age distribution was 20.1% under the age of 18, 3.4% from 18 to 24, 31.6% from 25 to 44, 35.7% from 45 to 64, and 9.2% 65 or older.  The median age was 42 years. For every 100 females, there were 94.2 males.  For every 100 females age 18 and over, there were 92.1 males.

The median household income was $102,094 and the median family income  was $122,142. Males had a median income of $79,518 versus $60,058 for females. The per capita income for the CDP was $56,913.  About 1.7% of families and 3.8% of the population were below the poverty line, including 3.1% of those under age 18 and 4.5% of those age 65 or over.

References

External links
 Tamalpais Community Services District
 Tamalpais Valley Improvement Club

Census-designated places in Marin County, California
Census-designated places in California